Prayers Be Answered is the second album release and the first studio album by the New Zealand band The Dance Exponents, released in December 1983. The album peaked at #4 and spent 45 weeks on the New Zealand Album charts.

The album won the Best Album award at the 1984 New Zealand Music Awards.

In May 2013, Universal Music re-released the album digitally in New Zealand in remastered standard and deluxe editions. The deluxe edition has twelve additional tracks of singles, B-sides, rarities and demos.

Track listing
"All I Can Do" (Luck)
"Know Your Own Heart" (Luck)
"Shattered Ornaments" (Luck)
"Victoria" (Luck)
"Your Best Friend Loves Me Too" (Luck)
"I'll Say Goodbye (Even Though I'm Blue)" (Luck)
"Checking To See That Your Kiss Is The Same" (Luck/Jones)
"Just Me And You" (Luck)
"Envy The Grave" (Gent/Jones/Luck)
"Swimming To The Table Of An Unknown Girl" (Luck)
"Gone Forever In Another Car" (Luck)
"Poland" (Luck)

Additional tracks on 2013 digital deluxe edition:
"Airway Spies" (Luck)
"Victoria" (original single version) (Luck)
"All I Can Do" (original single version) (Luck)
"Your Best Friend Loves Me Too" (original version) (Luck)
"Poland" (original version) (Luck)
"Can't Kiss The Lips Of A Memory" (Luck)
"I'm Not The One" (Luck)
"Social Life" (Luck)
"Perfect Romance" (demo) (Luck)
"My Date With You Was A Date With No One" (demo) (Luck)
"Walk Around The Roses" (demo) (Luck)
"The Empty Bunk In The Bunkhouse" (Luck)

Band members
Jordan Luck (vocals)
Brian Jones (guitar)
David Gent (bass guitar)
Michael "Harry" Harallambi (drums)

Additional musicians
Peter Van Der Fluit (keyboards)
Andrew McLennan (keyboards)
Stuart Pearce (keyboards)
Andrew Couston (saxophone)

Credits
Produced by Dave Marett
Engineered by Dave Marett & Graeme Myhre
Recorded at Mandrill Studios, Auckland, New Zealand
Tracks 1, 2 & 5 mixed By Tim Kramer at Festival Studios, Sydney Australia
Art direction & design: Alan Scholz, Mushroom Art

Charts

Weekly charts

Year-end charts

References 

1983 albums
The Exponents albums